Jytte is a feminine Danish given name. Notable people with the name include:

Jytte Abildstrøm (born 1934), Danish actress
Jytte Hansen (born 1932), Danish swimmer
Jytte Hilden (born 1942), Danish chemical engineer and politician
Jytte Klausen (born 1954), Danish academic
Jytte Olsen, Danish beauty queen

Danish feminine given names